Pambar River, also called Sarpanadi, is a river which flows through the Sivaganga, Pudukkottai and Ramanathapuram districts of Tamil Nadu, India. It originates at Perunganur in Pudukkottai district and flows for about  before joining the Bay of Bengal at Puttukidapatnam. It joins the Tennar at Tevarendal and Virusuliar at Kidangur. The holy town of Thiruppunavayil or Thiruppunavasal is along its banks. The Pambar formed the official boundary between the Thanjavur Maratha and Ramnad kingdoms from 1725 to 1799. Currently, it forms Pudukkottai district's boundary with Sivaganga and Ramanathapuram districts.

Notes 

Rivers of Tamil Nadu
Rivers of India